Richard Hyland is an American author and legal scholar. He is a law professor at the Camden campus of Rutgers Law School, specializing in contract law, particularly the law of the sale of goods and international trade.

In May 2009, Oxford University Press published Gifts: A Study in Comparative Law, Hyland's wide-ranging comparative investigation of the law governing the giving of gifts. This book delves into the historical background of the subject and also covers gift giving under various common law and private law systems.

The book was widely reviewed in the field and garnered plaudits. NJW (Neue Juristische Wochenschrift, New Legal Weekly), the leading magazine for legal theory and practice in Germany, selected Gifts as one of eight law books of the year. In addition to Gifts, Hyland has co-written two textbooks and many articles for scholarly journals.

In addition to his extensive legal education, honors, and experience, Hyland earned a Master of Fine Arts degree in fiction from Columbia University in 2001, has written literary criticism, and is conducting interviews for a book about the turbulent years of Harvard in the late 1960s, when he was an undergraduate.

Books

References

Harvard University alumni
UC Berkeley School of Law alumni
Rutgers School of Law–Camden faculty
Columbia University School of the Arts alumni
Year of birth missing (living people)
Living people
Place of birth missing (living people)